Mico Howles known professionally as Meekz is a masked British rapper from Manchester City. His single "Fresh Out The Bank" with Dave peaked at 35 on Billboard's Mainstream Top 40 in 2022.

Music career

2020
Meekz released Year of The Real produced by MkThePlug featuring notable acts including M1llionz and Pa Salieu.

2022
Meekz appeared on an episode of Amelia Dimoldenberg's Chicken Shop Date.

In November 2022, Meekz released an album titled Respect The Come Up featuring Central Cee and Dave, among others.

Discography

Albums 
 Respect The Come Up (2022)

Singles 
"Hoods Hottest" (2019)
"Like Me" (2020)
"Year Of The Real" (featuring M1llionz, Teeway and Pa Salieu) (2020)
"Daily Duppy" (2022)
"Say Less" (2022)

Awards and nominations

References

External links
 Official website

Living people
British male rappers